Marcello Montanari (born September 25, 1965 in Portoferraio) is a retired Italian professional football player and coach. He is currently an assistant manager with A.C. Reggiana 1919.

1965 births
Living people
Italian footballers
Serie A players
Serie B players
A.C. Reggiana 1919 players
U.S. Livorno 1915 players
Venezia F.C. players
S.S.D. Lucchese 1905 players
Inter Milan players
S.S.C. Bari players
U.S. Massese 1919 players
Italian football managers
Association football defenders